Vincent Acapandié (born 9 February 1990) is a French footballer who plays for French club AS Excelsior. He plays as a right-sided defender who can also play as a midfielder. He is a French youth international having represented his nation at under-16 and under-17 level. In 2007, he was a part of the under-17 team that played at both the 2007 UEFA European Under-17 Football Championship and 2007 FIFA U-17 World Cup.

Club career
Acapandié was born in Saint-Pierre, Réunion. On 25 May 2010, he signed his first professional contract agreeing to a three-year deal with Auxerre. He made his professional debut on 8 January 2011 appearing as a substitute in a Coupe de France match against Wasquehal. During the 2011–12 season he had a spell with Ligue 2 side AC Arles-Avignon.

In July 2013, he had a trial with English League 1 side Bradford City.

In January 2014, Acapandié signed a one-year contract with Saint-Pierroise.

Personal life
Acapandié is the cousin of the footballers William Gros and Mathieu Acapandié.

References

External links
 
 
 

1990 births
Living people
People from Saint-Pierre, Réunion
French footballers
France youth international footballers
Footballers from Réunion
French people of Malagasy descent
Association football defenders
Association football midfielders
AJ Auxerre players
AC Arlésien players
JS Saint-Pierroise players
AS Excelsior players
Ligue 2 players